Angelica adzharica, the Adjarian angelica is a species of angelica in the carrot family that is endemic to Adjara in Georgia. It can be found in meadows and subalpine tall herb communities, in montane and subalpine zones between 700 and 2,300 m elevation. It is threatened by overgrazing and hay making.

References

adzharica
Endemic flora of Georgia (country)
Endangered plants
Plants described in 1967